

The Ferguson monoplane was the first  Irish heavier-than-air craft to fly. The monoplane was designed by Harry Ferguson and built by his brother's company J.B. Ferguson & Company in Belfast.

Development
Harry Ferguson started as an Irish mechanic and while working with his brother Joe became interested in aircraft. Ferguson first flew his monoplane on 31 December 1909, the first flight of an Irish heavier-than-air craft. The monoplane was flown during 1910, including one flight of 2.5 miles (4 km), but was badly damaged in a heavy landing in December 1910.

Specifications

References

Notes

Bibliography

1900s British experimental aircraft
Aircraft first flown in 1909
Single-engined tractor aircraft
High-wing aircraft